Boris Becker and Slobodan Živojinović were the defending champions, but did not participate this year.

Wally Masur and Tom Nijssen won the title, defeating John Fitzgerald and Tomáš Šmíd 7–5, 7–6 in the final.

Seeds

  Rick Leach /  Jim Pugh (quarterfinals)
  John Fitzgerald /  Tomáš Šmíd (final)
  Wally Masur /  Tom Nijssen (champions)
  Eric Jelen /  Patrik Kühnen (semifinals, withdrew)

Draw

Draw

References
Draw

1988 Grand Prix (tennis)
Donnay Indoor Championships